Marios Antoniou (born November 5, 1980 in Limassol, Cyprus) is a Cypriot football midfielder who plays for Aris Limassol. His former teams Alki Larnaca, Apollon Limassol and AEL FC.

External links 
 

1980 births
Living people
Cypriot footballers
Cyprus international footballers
Alki Larnaca FC players
AEL Limassol players
Apollon Limassol FC players
Aris Limassol FC players
Association football midfielders
People from Larnaca